John Henry Maund (5 January 1916 – 1994) was an English footballer who played as a right winger for Hednesford Town, Aston Villa, Nottingham Forest, and Walsall.

Career
Maund joined Aston Villa from Hednesford Town in October 1934. He was sold to Nottingham Forest in July 1939. During World War II he played as a guest for Notts County, Walsall, Northampton Town, and Port Vale. He later played for Walsall, and also worked as the club's assistant trainer.

Career statistics
Source:

References

1916 births
1994 deaths
People from Hednesford
English footballers
Association football wingers
Hednesford Town F.C. players
Aston Villa F.C. players
Nottingham Forest F.C. players
Notts County F.C. wartime guest players
Walsall F.C. wartime guest players
Northampton Town F.C. wartime guest players
Port Vale F.C. wartime guest players
Walsall F.C. players
English Football League players
Association football coaches
Walsall F.C. non-playing staff